Vavakkad is a village situated along the northern border of Ernakulam District, Paravur taluk,  Kerala, South India.

Location 
Vavakkad is located 27 km from the city of Ernakulam and 23 km from Cochin International airport, Nedumbassery. National Highway No 66 passes within 1.5 km of the village. Famous Cherai Beach is just 4 km away.

History
The town's name derives from "Vaval Kadu" (literally, "forest of bats"). It was part of Thiruvithamkoor (Travancore) province before the reunion of states.

Vavakkad was the first village in Kerala to give a monthly pension to senior citizens above 70 years of age. Once famous for the production of coir, this industry is now in decline.

Library
Gurudeva Memorial library and its surrounding ground is the center of cultural activities in Vavakkad. People meet there regularly to debate public issues. The library was founded in 1954 and named after Sree Narayana Guru, who is considered to be the father of cultural reform in Kerala.

Public figures
Paravoor Bharathan, a popular comedian in the Malayalam film industry, who expired in 2015 is from here. There are more than 300 films to his credit.

Political representatives

References 

Villages in Ernakulam district